Eny or ENY may refer to:

 Eny Erlangga (born 1981), Indonesian badminton player
 Eny Widiowati (born 1980), Indonesian badminton player
 ENY, the IATA location identifier for Yan'an Nanniwan Airport, China
 ENY, the ICAO airline designator for Envoy Air